William Dodson Broyles Jr. (born October 8, 1944) is an American screenwriter, who has worked on the television series China Beach, and the films Apollo 13, Cast Away, Entrapment, Planet of the Apes, Unfaithful, The Polar Express, and Jarhead. He also assisted in the screenplay of Saving Private Ryan.

Early life 
Broyles was born in Houston, Texas, the son of Elizabeth (née Bills) and William Dodson Broyles. He was raised in Baytown, Texas, graduated from Robert E. Lee High School and attended Rice University, earning a B.A. degree in History in 1966. While at Rice, Broyles was an active member of the student body and a contributing editor to the student newspaper, the Rice Thresher. As early as 1966, Broyles was also contributing articles to the Houston Post. Broyles served as president of the Rice student association during the 1965–1966 academic year, and was awarded the Hugh Scott Cameron award for outstanding community service. He has remained a strong supporter of the University throughout his career, delivering the commencement speech in 1983, and receiving the Distinguished Alumni Award in 1993.

After graduating from Rice, Broyles studied as a Marshall Scholar at Oxford University where he earned an M.A. degree in Politics, Philosophy, and Economics in 1968. While at Oxford, Broyles pursued his interests in both journalism and public service. He wrote political columns for the Oxford University magazine and contributed articles to The Economist magazine of London. He also spoke throughout England for the United States Information Service. He later worked briefly for Leo Kramer, Inc., a Washington, D.C. social sciences consulting firm as a consultant on Model Cities, Manpower, and VISTA training programs.

Military career 
In 1968, Broyles's career was put on hold when he enlisted into the United States Marine Corps. Between 1969 and 1971, he rose to the rank of First Lieutenant and served in Vietnam, first as an infantry platoon commander, and later as an aide-de-camp to the Assistant Division Commander, 1st Marine Division. Due to his educational background and experience, his assigned duties included social issues with an emphasis on the refugees in the Quang Nam Province. Broyles received the Bronze Star and the Vietnamese Cross of Gallantry with Silver Star.

Broyles's experiences in Vietnam inspired two of his most critically acclaimed projects. In 1984, he was one of the first veterans to return to Vietnam, and his book Brothers in Arms: A Journey from War to Peace, recounts his visit and his impressions of the aftermath of war on himself and his fellow Marines, as well as on the country he fought against in battle.

In 1988, Broyles once again drew upon his memories in Vietnam when he co-created the award-winning television series, China Beach, a weekly drama for ABC about the doctors and nurses stationed at an American military base in Danang. Broyles also authored an article in Esquire "Why Men Love War".

Journalist 
Upon returning from Vietnam in 1971, Broyles picked up his professional career. He taught Philosophy and Political Science at the United States Naval Academy in Annapolis before returning to Texas as Chief Public Relations Officer for the Houston Independent School District. After a brief period of time in public service in Houston, Broyles was provided the opportunity to pursue his other primary interest, journalism. He became the founding editor of Texas Monthly magazine in 1972.

Broyles's and Texas Monthly publisher Michael R. Levy's goal was to create a magazine of national quality in Texas.  Within its first year, the publication won a National Magazine Award for excellence; and during Broyles's tenure it quickly gained recognition as a "writer's magazine," offering intelligent and entertaining articles on Texas life ranging from politics, culture, art, sports, the environment, social issues, and entertainment. The award-winning magazine continues today as an example of quality journalism with a regional focus and a national readership.

In 1980, Broyles and business partners, including Michael Levy, purchased New West magazine from Rupert Murdoch.  Broyles served as editor-in-chief of the magazine from 1980–1982, and saw it through its redesign and renaming as California. By 1982, Broyles's impressive track record in the magazine publishing world had caught the attention of Katharine Graham who recruited him to serve as editor of Newsweek magazine, replacing Lester Bernstein. He held that position from 1982 to 1984, when he resigned to pursue other interests.

During the next few years, Broyles made one more foray into the magazine publishing world, serving as editor-in-chief of Cable Guide, but he focused primarily on developing his writing career. In addition to Brothers in Arms, he wrote a three-act play titled Boot, about three soldiers in a bunker in Vietnam joined by a new recruit that they nickname "Boot". The plot follows the four young men as they struggle to cope with the realities of war.

Screenwriter 
In 1988, Broyles found critical success with the television series China Beach. In addition to co-creating the show with John Sacret Young, Broyles also wrote or co-wrote several of the early episodes, and remained producer and creative consultant throughout the run of the show. In 1991, the Golden Globe-winning China Beach went off the air, but Broyles was well into production on his second television project, Under Cover, a political espionage series following the adventures of husband-and-wife secret service agents, Dylan and Kate Del'Amico. The series was short-lived, and Broyles next adapted the Nigel Hamilton book, J.F.K.: Reckless Youth, for a 1993 television mini-series of the same name starring Patrick Dempsey as the young future president.

Also in 1993, Broyles turned his attention from television projects to writing feature films. He shares his first screenwriting credit with former Texas Monthly writer, Al Reinert for Apollo 13. The film, based loosely on the book Lost Moon, co-authored by astronaut Jim Lovell and Jeffrey Kluger, was directed by Ron Howard.  It was met with both critical and box office success, and Broyles and Reinert were nominated for the Academy Award for best adapted screenplay.

After Apollo 13, Broyles began work on Cast Away, an original screenplay about a FedEx engineer stranded on a deserted island. Released in 2000, the film was produced by Tom Hanks, directed by Robert Zemeckis, and stars Hanks as the resilient Chuck Noland. Apollo 13 and Cast Away secured Broyles's place as an A-list Hollywood screenwriter.

Other writing credits in motion pictures include Entrapment (1999), Planet of the Apes (2001), Unfaithful (2002), The Polar Express (2004), Jarhead (2005), and Flags of Our Fathers (2006).

Personal life
On November 5, 1988, Broyles married actress Linda Purl. They later divorced. His second wife was Sybil Ann Newman (later Mrs. James Raney), with whom he had two children. He married, thirdly, to Andrea Bettina Berndt. They have two daughters.

Filmography

See also 
 Wilson the Volleyball

References

Archival sources 
 The William Broyles Jr. Papers 1962–2002 (106 linear feet) are housed at the Wittliff Collections, Texas State University in San Marcos.

External links 

Allbusiness.com
Article by Broyles on his experiences in Vietnam

1944 births
Alumni of the University of Oxford
American memoirists
United States Marine Corps personnel of the Vietnam War
United States Marine Corps officers
American male screenwriters
American science fiction writers
American television writers
Living people
Marshall Scholars
Military personnel from Houston
People from Baytown, Texas
Rice University alumni
American male television writers
American male non-fiction writers
Screenwriters from Texas